Sheffield City Council elections took place on 2 May 2002. One third of seats were up for election. Since the previous election, the Liberal Democrats and Labour had each suffered one defection - Ronald Shepherd left the Labour grouping to sit as an Independent and Lib Dem Matthew Dixon defected, firstly as an Independent and then to the Conservatives. In this time an earlier Lib Dem defector, Trefor Morgan, also changed from an Independent to Liberal.

Following this election, the council returned to no overall control, as the sizable swing from Lib Dem to Labour allowed Labour to gain five seats directly from the Lib Dems, and two from earlier defections, making Labour narrowly the largest party with 43 seats to the Lib Dem's 42. Overall turnout was 30.0%.

Election result

This result had the following consequences for the total number of seats on the Council after the elections:

Ward results

References

2002 English local elections
2002
2000s in Sheffield